F-Spot is a slowly maintained image organizer, designed to provide personal photo management for the GNOME desktop environment. The name is a play on the word F-Stop.

History
The F-Spot project was started by Ettore Perazzoli and is maintained by Stephen Shaw. F-Spot is written in the C# programming language using Mono.

Before its shutdown and discontinuation in 2017, F-Spot was the standard image tool for several GNOME based distributions. Even before that, Fedora replaced F-Spot with Shotwell in Fedora 13. Ubuntu has done the same as of 10.10 Maverick Meerkat.

There is some new work to update F-Spot and potentially bring it to Windows and Mac.

Features
F-Spot aimed to have an interface that is simple to use but also facilitate advanced features such as tagging images, and displaying and exporting image metadata in Exif and XMP formats.

All major photographic image formats are supported, including JPEG, PNG, TIFF, DNG, GIF, SVG and PPM, as well as several vendor-specific RAW formats (CR2, PEF, ORF, SRF, CRW, MRW and RAF). As of 2008, the RAW formats were not editable with F-Spot. However, newer releases of F-Spot have the DevelopInUFRaw extension, which calls on UFRaw for the conversion work, and then re-imports the resulting JPEG back into F-Spot as a new version of the original RAW.

Photos can be imported directly from the camera. The driver support is provided by libgphoto2. The GNOME desktop environment can also optionally detect if a camera or a memory card has been attached, and import images to F-Spot automatically. Photo CDs can be created by selecting multiple photographs and selecting "Export to CD" from the main menu.

Basic functions such as crop and rotate available alongside more advanced features such as red-eye removal and versioning. The rotate function allows for movements in single degree increments with autocrop, not just 90-degree adjustment. Color adjustments are supported with a histogram. They include an auto-improve and individual brightness, contrast, hue, saturation and temperature.

Photos in the F-Spot library can be uploaded to a number of online photo storage sites. F-Spot supports two major gallery sites, Flickr and Picasa Web Albums, and also using stand-alone web gallery software, including Gallery and O.r.i.g.i.n.a.l. F-Spot can also generate static web gallery sites and export to Facebook. F-Spot automatically downsizes photos before exporting to Flickr, and though it describes this as "optional," there is no option to not downsize photos before export.

Technical information
When images are imported into F-Spot, they are written to disk. The folder is /username/Pictures/Photos/[year]/[month]/[Day].

See also

 Shotwell – digital photo manager for GNOME
 digiKam – digital photo manager by KDE
 Comparison of image viewers

References

External links

Discontinued software
Free image organizers
Linux image viewers
Free image viewers
Free photo software
Software that uses Mono (software)
Free software programmed in C Sharp
Applications using D-Bus
Graphics software that uses GTK
GNOME Applications
2010 software